Karen Elizabeth Sanford (May 31, 1932 – November 15, 2010) was a Canadian politician. She served as MLA for the Comox riding in the Legislative Assembly of British Columbia from 1972 to 1986, as a member of the British Columbia New Democratic Party. She died of cancer in 2010.

References

1932 births
People from Drumheller
British Columbia New Democratic Party MLAs
Women MLAs in British Columbia
2010 deaths